The East Timorese Ambassador in Beijing is the official representative of the Government of in Dili to the Government of the People's Republic of China.

List of representatives

References 

China
East Timor
Ambassadors